The Uganda women's national volleyball team represents Uganda in international women's volleyball competitions and friendly matches.

References
 Uganda Volleyball Federation

National women's volleyball teams
Volleyball
Volleyball in Uganda
Women's sport in Uganda